Acacia brunioides (common name : brown wattle) is an Australian spreading shrub belonging to the genus Acacia.

Its natural range goes from Gibraltar Range (New South Wales) north to McPherson Range. and near Toowooba (South East Queensland); also Wallangarra to Stanthorpe (South East Queensland).

This multi-branched shrub grows to a height of about 2 m. Its branchlets lack any hair or are covered with minute soft erect hairs. The many phyllodes are spirally arranged or irregularly whorled. Their dimensions are : 2.5–12 mm long, and 0.4–0.7 mm wide

The inflorescences are simple with one globular flower head per axil, with 16 to 27 creamy white or golden flowers. The blackish pods are narrow and about 5 cm long and 7 to 15 mm wide.

It is sometimes confused with Acacia conferta.

References

Flora of Australia online

brunioides
Flora of New South Wales
Flora of Queensland
Taxa named by Allan Cunningham (botanist)